Admiral Igor Olegovich Kostyukov (born 21 February 1961) is a Russian naval officer. , he is the Head of the Russian General Staff's Main Intelligence Department (GRU).

Military career
Kostyukov was appointed the acting Director of GRU on 22 November 2018 following the death of his predecessor Igor Korobov and is a noted hardliner. This posting also made him the first naval officer in the history of the GRU to take the office of Director of Military Intelligence. He has been placed on the US Government's "blacklist" for allegedly interfering in the 2016 US presidential elections. He was further promoted to the rank of Admiral in late 2019.

Sanctions
In March 2022, during the 2022 Russian invasion of Ukraine, Kostyukov was placed on a European Union "blacklist".

March 2022 illness
On 25 March 2022, former Ukrainian Minister of Internal Affairs Arsen Avakov claimed that Kostyukov and Russian defence minister Sergey Shoigu had had a sudden illness, stating, "The symptoms of both are exactly the same - heartburn, shortness of breath." The Moscow Times considered Kostyukov to have disappeared from public view in mid-March together with other senior siloviki (key Russian security officials), including Sergey Shoigu, Viktor Zolotov and Valery Gerasimov.

References

External links

1961 births
Living people
GRU Chiefs
Military Academy of the General Staff of the Armed Forces of Russia alumni
Russian admirals
Heroes of the Russian Federation
Russian individuals subject to the U.S. Department of the Treasury sanctions